El Que Habla Con Las Manos is a reggaeton compilation album made by various artists. It was released November 9, 2004 on VI Music. Puerto Rican hit maker Eliel produced this album.

Charts

Track listing 
 "Ronca" - Don Omar, Héctor el Father, & Zion
 "Vamos A Matarnos En La Raya" - Héctor el Father
 "Cae La Noche" - Don Omar
 "La Demoledora" - Polaco
 "Lo Prohibido" - Valentino
 "Duelo" - Tito "El Bambino"
 "Sólo Una Noche" - Zion
 "Tranquila Chiquilla" - Magnate
 "Te Quiero A Ti" - Jomar
 "Agitalas" - Wibal & Alex
 "La Popola" - Glory
 "Hoy Nena Quiero" - Baby Ranks
 "Bandolera" - Joan & O'Neill
 "Si Tú No Estás" - Marvin
 "Ronca (Bounce Remix)" - Don Omar, Héctor el Father, & Zion
 "Duele" - Tito "El Bambino"
 "De Niña A Mujer" - Héctor el Father & Don Omar
 "Tú Al Igual Que Yo" - Magnate & Valentino
 "Te Vas" - Divino
 "Te Hago El Amor" - Zion & Lennox
 "Luna" - Don Omar

Sales and certifications

References 

Reggaeton compilation albums
2004 compilation albums
Albums produced by Rafy Mercenario